L. bakeri may refer to:
  Leptodeira bakeri, Ruthven, 1936, the Baker's cat-eyed snake, a snake species in the genus Leptodeira
 Leptoporus bakeri, a synonym for Rigidoporus microporus, a plant pathogen
 Limnanthes bakeri, the Baker's meadowfoam, a rare plant species endemic to Mendocino County, California

See also
 Bakeri (disambiguation)